Rotokauri railway station (formerly Te Rapa railway station), also known as The Hub, is a railway station, park and ride, and bus station in north Hamilton, New Zealand serving Rotokauri and Te Rapa. Located on the North Island Main Trunk, it was previously a flag station, and was closed in January 1971. It reopened as an integrated transport hub in 2021 as part of Te Huia services between Hamilton and Papakura. Services started on 6 April 2021.

History

Te Rapa Railway Station 
A through siding was added in 1878, it appeared in the April 1879 timetable and, by 1884, it had a passing loop for 21 wagons, a shelter shed, platform and loading bank.

In 1916, it was equipped with distant signals and was part of the extension of automatic signalling from Ngāruawahiā to Frankton from Sunday 30 June 1929, when the sidings were switch-locked and automatically controlled and the former single track doubled. The sidings were extended into the RNZAF stores depot, to the south east, when it was built during the war There were also bulk cement and Apple & Pear Board sidings.

In July 1965 it was noted that, for the past nine months, passenger bookings had been nil and, in September, approval was given to remove the station building and low-level platform. Construction of a new marshalling yard near the Racecourse began in December 1967.

Rotokauri Transport Hub 

Modern plans for a transport hub in north Hamilton started around 2007 in the Rotokauri Structure Plan and District Plan. Eventually, land was bought in 2017, and funding for the transport hub was announced in the 2018-2028 10 Year Plan.

At a meeting of the Hamilton Public Transport Joint Committee on November 28 2018, the Council estimated the cost of a new station, park and ride and transport hub at Rotokauri to be $21m, with $6.4m allowed to land purchasing. The plan was for an integrated transit hub in north Hamilton to connect with a proposed Hamilton to Auckland passenger train. These plans were dependent on NZTA funding for both the train and the hub itself. At the time of the Joint Committee meeting in November 2018, the opening was scheduled for March 2020.

In 2019 the Sixth Labour Government announced funding for a passenger rail link between Auckland and Hamilton, at the time called Tron Express but later called Te Huia. This funding included the construction of a transport hub in Rotokauri, alongside maintenance facilities. In March 2020, the original planned opening date, Hamilton City Council announced new opening date of the park and ride scheme on August 3 2020, and an increased cost estimate of $29m, this was planned to coincide with the commencement of Te Huia services. The new station was built just south of the site of the original station. The March 2020 announcement also stated that the transit hub would have a rail platform, park and ride carpark, bus interchange, roading upgrades, passenger bridge and stairs. The council also highlighted a delay in lift installation was due to "due to international supply chain issues".

On January 29 2020, a blessing ceremony was held at the transit hub ahead of its opening week. The signs around the hub include both English Language and Reo Māori names. The station has two through-platforms, three lifts, and three sets of stairs. The over-bridge links the bus terminal, the platforms, and The Base shopping mall. The Hamilton City Council has purchased land next to the carpark in order to allow for a potential carpark expansion, or another development. There have also been changes in the road layout around the hub, including the construction of a new road called Kiriwai Drive, named after a local.

Services 

Currently the only train is Te Huia linking Hamilton to Auckland (changing trains at Papakura), four times daily on weekdays (two in each direction), and once each way on some Saturdays. These services started on 6 April 2021. These were the first passenger services since the original station closed. Even though the Northern Explorer passes through on the NIMT, it does not stop at this station.

Rotokauri Transport Hub is also a major point along several of Hamilton and Waikato's bus routes. It was planned that the hub would have 180 daily bus movements at the start, but this will increase to 400.

Accidents 
In a fog in 1934, a southbound train from Auckland collided with a goods train. The only casualty was a pig, but the AB locomotive was thrown on its side.

References

External links 
 Rotokauri Transport Hub information page on Hamilton City Council's website
 Google Street View of station site
 Aerial view of construction site in 2020
 Station information page on Te Huia website
 Retrolens aerial image of Te Rapa from 3 December 1948
 Facebook Post from Dr Gaurav Sharma MP (Labour) from the blessing ceremony

Railway stations in New Zealand
Rail transport in Waikato
Buildings and structures in Waikato
Railway stations opened in 1877
Railway stations closed in 1971
Railway stations opened in 2021
1877 establishments in New Zealand